Vazik Kazarian aka Vazik Ghazarian (born 4 May 1937 Bahmanshir, Khuzestan, Iran) was an Iranian Armenian boxer  who became a member of Iran senior national Boxing team in 1956, and was also a member of Tehran Taj Club. He participated as a member of the Iranian boxers at the 1958 Asian Games, in the Light-welterweight division, and also at the 1960 Summer Olympics, in the Light-welterweight division. 
In Tokyo 1958, Kazarian reached the final of the Light-welterweight division after defeating Sueb Chundakowsolaya from
Thailand, on points in the semifinal, and eventually won the silver medal of the 63.5 kg boxing division, after losing on points to Shigemasa Kawakami from Japan in the final. He retired from championship boxing and the Iranian national boxing team, after returning from the 1960 Summer Olympics.

1960 Olympic results
Below is the record of Vazik Kazarian, an Iranian light welterweight boxer who competed at the 1960 Rome Olympics:

 Round of 64: bye
 Round of 32: lost to Bobby Kelsey (Great Britain) by decision, 2-3

References

Living people
1937 births
Iranian people of Armenian descent
Iranian male boxers
Asian Games medalists in boxing
Olympic boxers of Iran
Boxers at the 1960 Summer Olympics
Boxers at the 1958 Asian Games
Asian Games silver medalists for Iran
Ethnic Armenian sportspeople
Sportspeople from Khuzestan province
Medalists at the 1958 Asian Games
Light-welterweight boxers